Václav Vorlíček (3 June 1930 – 5 February 2019) was a Czech film director. He studied filmmaking at FAMU from 1951 to 1956, and began directing feature films since the early 1960s. His filmography includes several comedies made in collaboration with screenwriter Miloš Macourek. He directed several children's and fairytale films, most notably Tři oříšky pro Popelku (1973), a Christmas film classic in many European countries.

The director was a widower and father of two daughters. He died in his hometown Prague, aged 88, from cancer.

Selected filmography
 Who Wants to Kill Jessie? (1966)
 The End of Agent W4C (1967)
 You Are a Widow, Sir (1970)
 Dívka na koštěti (1971)
 Tři oříšky pro Popelku (1973)
 How to Drown Dr. Mracek, the Lawyer (1974)
 Což takhle dát si špenát (1977)
 The Prince and the Evening Star (1979)
 Arabela (1979-1980)
 Zelená vlna (1982)
 Young Wine (1986)

References

External links
 

1930 births
2019 deaths
Czechoslovak film directors
German-language film directors
Film directors from Prague
Academy of Performing Arts in Prague alumni